Motueka is a former New Zealand parliamentary electorate.

Population centres
In the 1860 electoral redistribution, the House of Representatives increased the number of representatives by 12, reflecting the immense population growth since the original electorates were established in 1853. The redistribution created 15 additional electorates with between one and three members, and Motueka was one of the single-member electorates. The electorates were distributed to provinces so that every province had at least two members. Within each province, the number of registered electors by electorate varied greatly. The Motueka electorate had 311 registered electors for the 1861 election.

Localities within the electorate were Motueka and Māpua. The Motueka electorate took in about half the area of the prior  electorate; the other half had gone to the  electorate.

History
From the 3rd to the 10th New Zealand Parliament, Motueka was represented by five Members of Parliament (counting Monro, who was unseated following a petition). Curtis and Parker had previously represented the  electorate. David Monro represented the electorate in 1871 until he was unseated by Parliament on a petition. Parker was followed by Richmond Hursthouse 1876–87, then John Kerr 1887–90.

In , Hudson was unexpectedly beaten by 24-year-old George Black of the United Party. The Reform Party looked for potential candidates to win back the electorate, and a young farmer who was not even a member, Keith Holyoake, was suggested. Holyoake, who had been saving money to go overseas, was chosen in June 1931 from five candidates to contest Motueka, and his savings went into the election campaign instead. Meanwhile, there was a desire by parts of the United Party to enter into a coalition with the Reform Party to avoid vote splitting on the centre-right, but it was not until September that the United–Reform Coalition was announced.

Black had voted with the Labour Party in March 1931 on the Finance Bill and was expelled from the United Party the following day, thus becoming an Independent. In October 1932, Black committed suicide, and this caused the 1932 Motueka by-election, which was won by future prime minister Holyoake.

Members of Parliament

Key

Table footnotes:

Election results

1943 election

1938 election

1935 election

1932 by-election

1931 election

1928 election

1925 election

1914 election

1899 election

1896 election

1887 election

Notes

References

Historical electorates of New Zealand
1860 establishments in New Zealand
1890 disestablishments in New Zealand
1946 disestablishments in New Zealand
1896 establishments in New Zealand
Motueka
Politics of the Tasman District